Johnny Pat BEM (born John Henry Paterson; 1941) is an entertainer from Hull and East Yorkshire and has been the front-man for the band The Aces for over fifty years. He was awarded the British Empire Medal in 2017 "for services to charitable fundraising and the community."

Early life and work
Pat was born in Hull on 2 December 1941. From 1953 he attended Malet Lambert School, at that time a grammar school. His involvement in music began during the British skiffle boom of the 1950s, fronting the band The Aces in his teens.

Music career
The line-up of The Aces changed a few times, but they were eventually signed to Parlophone during the beat boom era, and released two singles with them. The Aces toured the United Kingdom and played as a support act for both The Beatles and The Rolling Stones. As well as fronting The Aces, Johnny Pat played with another Hull band, The Small Four, who were signed to Pye Records and supported Jimi Hendrix at the Skyline Ballroom in 1967. During the 1980s he managed the Hull live music venue Johnny Pat's Place.

Charity work
Johnny Pat continues to perform both solo and with The Aces, who have now been in showbusiness for well over fifty years. They frequently perform as part of charity fundraising events, and have been described as "a rock and roll band with a huge and enthusiastic following." Since 2007 he has been a core member of the Hull community association The Tugmates. In the Queen's 2017 Birthday Honours he was awarded the British Empire Medal (BEM) for services to charity fundraising and the community in Hull and East Riding of Yorkshire.

Singles

UK

 Wait Till Tomorrow (Parlophone) Dec. 1963 (B= The Last One)
 I Count The Tears (Parlophone) Feb. 1964 (B= But Say It Isn't So)
USA
 Counting Tears (Stellar) Aug. 1964 (B= But Say It Isn't So)

References

Entertainers from Yorkshire
1941 births
Living people
People from Kingston upon Hull